Queen Street Baptist Church is a historic African-American Baptist church located at Norfolk, Virginia. It was built in 1910–1911, and is a rectangular one-story brick church in the Late Gothic Revival style. The façade and side elevations have Gothic pointed arch windows and the church is topped by a spire that rests atop the roof at the façade.  An educational annex was built in 1952, and expanded in 1957.  The Queen Street Baptist Church congregation dates to 1884.

It was listed on the National Register of Historic Places in 2006.

References

African-American history of Virginia
20th-century Methodist church buildings in the United States
Baptist churches in Virginia
Churches on the National Register of Historic Places in Virginia
Gothic Revival church buildings in Virginia
Churches completed in 1911
Churches in Norfolk, Virginia
National Register of Historic Places in Norfolk, Virginia